This timeline tries to compile dates of important historical events that happened in or that led to the rise of the Middle East. The Middle East is the territory that comprises today's Egypt, the Persian Gulf states, Iran, Iraq, Israel and Palestine, Cyprus, Jordan, Lebanon, Oman, Saudi Arabia, Syria, Turkey, United Arab Emirates, and Yemen. The Middle East, with its particular characteristics, was not to emerge until the late second millennium AD. To refer to a concept similar to that of today's Middle East but earlier in time, the term ancient Near East is used.

This list is intended as a timeline of the history of the Middle East. For more detailed information, see articles on the histories of individual countries. See ancient Near East for ancient history of the Middle East.

Paleolithic period
 16000 BC – Kebaran period
 13050 to 7050 BC – Natufian culture
 12500 BC – The world's oldest evidence of bread-making has been found at Shubayqa 1, in Jordan
 11000 BC – The oldest known evidence of beer found in Mount Carmel

Neolithic period 
 10000 BC – Pre-Pottery Neolithic A
 10000 BC – earliest neolithic sanctuaries at Göbekli Tepe in southern Anatolia
 9300 BC – first cultivating of wild emmer wheat in Netiv HaGdud and other sites in Jordan by hunter gatherers
 10000 to 8800 BC — Shepherd Neolithic

9th millennium B.C.
 8500 BC – first domestication of the cow (taurine line from the aurochs near Çayönü Tepesi in southeastern Anatolia and Dja'de el-Mughara in northern Iraq).
 8400 to 8100 BC – first settlements at Nevali Cori in Anatolia
 8200 to 7650 BC – first domestication of emmer wheat near Damascus, Syria

8th millennium BC
 8000 BC – human settlements at Sagalassos in southwest Anatolia
 8000 BC – first domestication of goats from the bezoar ibex in Iran
 8000 BC – first domestication of einkorn wheat near Karaca Dağ in southeast Anatolia.
 8000 BC – first domestication of Durum wheat near Karaca Dağ in the Levant  and the Ethiopian Highlands 
 7500 BC – Çatalhöyük, very large Neolithic and Chalcolithic settlement in southern Anatolia
 7000 BC – Jarmo, one of the oldest agricultural communities, in northern Iraq

7th millennium BC
 7000 to 6500 BC – early undecorated, unglazed and low-fired pottery in Hassuna
 7000 BC — settlements in Byblos
 7000 BC — Neolithic farmers start to move in to Europe, stimulating the European neolithic for over 3 thousand years
 6000 to 4000 BC – invention of the potter's wheel in Mesopotamia

6th millennium BC
 6000 BC – first irrigation and flood control in Mesopotamia and Egypt
 6000 to 4300 BC – first sail boats in Mesopotamia 
 6000 to 3000 BC — Pre-dynastic Egypt 
 5600 BC – Black Sea floods according to the Black Sea deluge theory
 5509 BC – date of creation according to the Byzantine calendar
 5500 BC – first large scale agriculture by the Sumerians and in the valley of the Nile
 5403 BC – expulsion from the Garden of Eden according to the Genealogies of Genesis
 5100 BC – first Temples in South Mesopotamia
 5000 BC — Byblos is named a city
 5000 BC — Aleppo is settled

5th millennium BC
 4500 BC – civilization of Susa and Kish in Mesopotamia
 4570 to 4250 BC – Merimde culture on the Nile
 4400 to 4000 BC – Badari culture on the Nile
 4000 BC – first use of light wooden ploughs in Mesopotamia
 4000 BC – Egyptians discover how to make bread using yeast

Ancient Near East

4th millennium BC 

 4000 to 3000 BC – domestication of the African wild ass in Egypt or Mesopotamia, producing the donkey
 4000 BC – city of Ur in Mesopotamia
 4000 to 3100 BC – Uruk period
 4000 to 3000 BC – Naqada culture on the Nile
 3760 BC – date of creation according to some interpretations of Jewish chronology 
 3650 BC – The foundation of the city of Gaziantep
 3600 BC – first civilization in the world: Sumer (city-states) in modern-day southern Iraq
 3500 BC – City of Ebla in Syria is founded
 3500 to 3000 BC – one of the first appearances of wheeled vehicles in Mesopotamia
 3500 BC – beginning of desertification of the Sahara: the shift from a habitable region to a barren desert
 3500 BC – first examples of Sumerian writing in Mesopotamia, in the cities of Uruk and Susa (cuneiform writings)
 3500 BC – first cities in Egypt
 3300 BC – Earliest Cuneiform writings
 3200 BC – Iry-Hor reigns as pharaoh of Upper Egypt, the earliest historical person known by name
 3100 BC – King Narmer unifies the Upper and Lower Egyptian Kingdoms, and gives birth to the world's first nation
 3100 to 2686 BC – early Dynastic Period (Egypt)
 3100 BC – Earliest hieroglyphs
 3000 BC – The temple of Haddad in Aleppo
 3000 to 2800 BC – Earliest evidence of Taxation found in Egypt

3rd millennium BC 
 3000 to 2000 BC – First domestication of the dromedaries in Somalia and southern Arabia
 3000 to 2300 BC – First Kingdom of Ebla
 2900 to 2350 BC – First ziggurats in Sumer
 2900 to 2500 BC – First Kingdom of Mari
 2800 BC – Beginning of Uruk's decline
 2700 to 539 BC – Elam 
 2600 to 2350 BC – early Dynastic III period in Mesopotamia 
 2600 to 2300 BC – Kingdom of Nagar
 2600 to 2025 BC – Early Assyrian Period
 2575 to 2150 BC – Old Kingdom of Egypt
 2560 BC – completion of the Great Pyramid of Giza
 2500 BC – First use of war wagons as recorded by the Standard of Ur
 2500 BC – First domestication of the camel in central Asia and Arabia
 2500 BC – Ur-Nina first king of Lagash
 2500 to 2290 BC – Second Kingdom of Mari
 2340 to 2280 BC – Reign of Sargon of Akkad, founder of the dynasty of the Akkad
 2334 to 2154 BC – Akkadian Empire
 2300 to 2000 BC – Second Kingdom of Ebla
 2266 to 1761 BC – Third Kingdom of Mari
 2254 to 2218 BC – Naram-Sin of Akkad, under whom the empire reached its maximum strength and the first taking the title "god of Akkad"
 2200 BC – Akkad taken by the Guti
 2112 to 2094 BC – Ur-Nammu, founder of the Third Dynasty of Ur
 2111 to 2004 BC – Third Dynasty of Ur
 2052 to 1570 BC – Middle Kingdom in Egypt
 2025 to 1378 BC  – Old Assyrian Empire
 2004 BC – Elamites destroy Ur
 2004 to 1763 BC – Rise of the Amorites who established several city-states in Mesopotamia
 2000 to 1600 BC – Third Kingdom of Ebla
 2000 to 1334 BC – Kingdom of Qatna
 2000 BC – First use of the spoke-wheel by the Andronovo culture and soon after used by horse cultures of the Caucasus region in war chariots

2nd millennium BC 
 1900 BC – Hittites Old Kingdom in Anatolia
 1800 BC – civilization in Canaan
 1800 to 1200 BC – the emergence of the city of Ugarit when it ruled a coastal kingdom, trading with Egypt, Cyprus, the Aegean, Syria, the Hittites, and others
 1792 to 1750 BC – the reign of Hammurabi of the First Babylonian Dynasty, extended control throughout Mesopotamia, known for the Code of Hammurabi, one of the earliest codes of law
 1775 to 1761 BC – the reign of Zimri-Lim of Mari, extended control throughout Syria and Upper Mesopotamia, he was allied to Hammurabi
 1763 to 1595 BC – Paleo-Babylonian Empire
 1725 to 1550 BC – Hyksos (Canaanite) domination of Egypt
 1600 to 1360 BC – Egyptian domination over Canaan and Syria
 1594 BCE – Kassites take Babylon
 1595 to 1155 BC – Kassite dynasty
 1550 to 1077 BC – New Kingdom of Egypt
 1500 to 1300 BC – Kingdom Mitanni, a Hurrian-speaking state in northern Syria and southeast Anatolia 
 1500 to 539 BC – Phoenicia and the spread of their alphabet from which almost all modern phonetic alphabets derived
 1457 BC – Battle of Megiddo 
 1380 to 1336 BC – Shuppiluliuma, king of the Hittites who challenged Egypt for control of the lands between the Mediterranean and the Euphrates
 1370 to 1200 BC – Hittite Empire
 1350 to 1050 BC – Middle Assyrian Empire

 1300 BC – discovery of iron smelting and smithing techniques in Anatolia or the Caucasus: start of the Iron Age
 1300 to 125 BC – Kingdom of Edom
 1274 BC – Battle of Kadesh between the Egyptian Empire under Ramesses II and the Hittite Empire under Muwatalli II, largest chariot battle ever fought
 1259 BC – Egyptian-Hittite peace treaty, the first peace treaty ever recorded in history
 1245 to 1208 BC – Tukulti-Ninurta I, king of Assyria, first native Mesopotamian ruler in Babylon, took on the ancient title "King of Sumer and Akkad"
 1237 BC – Battle of Nihriya, resulting in Assyrian victory over the Hittites for control over remnants of the former empire of Mitanni in Asia Minor and the Levant 
 1234 BC – Babylon taken by the Assyrians
 1200 to 1050 BC – Bronze Age collapse
 1200 BC – oldest Phoenician alphabet inscription engraved on the sarcophagus of King Ahiram
 1200 to 884 BC – Sea Peoples, conjectured groups of seafaring raiders, invaded Anatolia, Syria, Canaan, Cyprus, and Egypt
 1200 to 546 BC – Lydian Empire
 1200 to 732 BC – Aramaean Kingdom of Aram-Damascus
 1190 BC – Hattusha, capital of the Hittites, taken by the Sea Peoples
 1184 BC – Fall of Troy
 1180 to 700 BC – Neo-Hittite kingdoms also known as Syro-Hittite states 
 1155 BC – Babylon taken by Elamites
 1100 to 539 BC – Neo-Elamite period
 1087 BC – Babylon destroyed by Assyrians
 1070 BC to 350 AD – Cushites, an ancient African Nubian kingdom in Sudan
 1102 to 850 BC – estimated period in which Homer lived
 1069 to 664 BC – Third Intermediate Period of Egypt
 1050 to 930 BC – Kingdom of Israel
 1041 BC – King David captures Jerusalem, designates it the capital of the united Kingdom of Israel
 1004 BC – King Solomon lays the foundation for the First Temple

1st millennium BC
 927 BC – Jerusalem becomes the capital of the (southern) Kingdom of Judah after the split of the United Monarchy
 884 to 858 BC – Ashurnasirpal II, king of Assyria, embarked on a vast program of expansion, known for his harshness, moved his capital to the city of Kalhu (Nimrod)
 884 to 612 BC – Neo-Assyrian Empire
 800 to 480 BC – Archaic period in Greece with the rise of the city-states, Greek colonies, and Epic Greek poetry: onset of Classical Antiquity
 776 BC – first Olympic Games
 745 to 727 BC – Tiglath-Pileser III, king of Assyria who introduced advanced civil, military, and political systems into the empire
 711 BC – Sargon II conquers the kingdom of Israel and exiles the inhabitants of Samaria
 710 BC – Sargon II captures Babylonia 
 689 BCE – Babylon destroyed by Sennacherib, king of the Assyria
 677 BC – Esarhaddon, king of Assyria, defeats the rebellion of Abdi-Milkutti, the king of the Phoenician state of Sidon
 678 to 549 BC – Median Empire
 672 to 525 BC – Twenty-sixth dynasty of Egypt
 667 BC – Ashurbanipal, king of Assyria, defeated the 25th Dynasty king Taharqa near Memphis
 626 to 539 BC – Chaldean Empire (Neo-Babylonian Empire)
 624 to 545 BC – Thales of Miletus, first philosopher in Ancient Greek philosophy, founder of the Milesian school
 612 BC – Fall of Nineveh by a coalition Babylonians, Medes, Persians, Chaldeans, Scythians, and Cimmerians, leading to the destruction of the Neo-Assyrian Empire
 605 BC – Battle of Carchemish between the Babylonians and the Egyptians allied with the remnants of the Assyrian army
 609 BC – Battle of Megiddo (609 BC) between Necho II and Josiah of Judea
 597 BC – King Nebuchadnezzar II of Babylon capturing Jerusalem
 587 BC – King Nebuchadnezzar II of Babylon destroys Jerusalem and Solomon's Temple
 570 to 495 BC – Pythagoras, founder of Pythagoreanism
 600 or 576 – 530 BC – Cyrus the Great conquered Babylon and created the Persian Achaemenid Empire
 550 to 330 BC – Achaemenid Empire
 547 BC – Battle of Pteria between the Lydian Empire and the Achaemenid empire
 539 BC – Fall of Babylon
 537 BC – Cyrus allows the Israelites to return from the Babylonian captivity and rebuild the Temple
 522 to 486 BC – reign of Darius the Great, third king of the Persian Achaemenid Empire
 516 BC – completion of the Second Temple
 510 to 323 BC – Classical Greek period with large annexations by the Persian Empire and a powerful influence on the Roman Empire and western civilization
 500 BC – Ionian Revolt
 499 to 449 BC – Greco-Persian Wars, finally won by the Greek city-states
 480 to 479 BC – Xerxes invades Greece, start of Second Persian invasion of Greece
 477 BC – founding of the Delian League, an association of Greek city-states under Athenian hegemony
 431 to 404 BC – Peloponnesian War between Sparta and Athens leading to the end of Athens' hegemony and weakening of Greece
 353 to 350 BC – Mausoleum at Halicarnassus is built in Lydia, one of the seven wonders of the ancient world
 334 to 262 BC – Zeno of Citium, Founder of the Stoic school of philosophy
 330 BC – Alexander the Great conquered Persia
 323 to 31 BC – Hellenistic period with Greek influence in Europe, Africa, and Asia, in the arts, exploration, literature, theatre, architecture, music, mathematics, philosophy, and science
 316 to 240 AD – Arcesilaus, founder of Academic skepticism
 300 BC – Foundation of the city of Antioch by Seleucus I Nicator 
 279 to 206 BC – Chrysippus of Soli, creator of the first system of Propositional logic
 247 BC to 224 AD – Parthian Empire
 230 to 140 BC – Diogenes of Babylon, scholarch of the Stoic school in Athens in 2nd century BC
 190 to 120 BC – Hipparchus, mathematician, astronomer and geographer from Bithynia who studied at Alexandria and Babylon. He discovered Axial precession, and gave the first tables of chords, analogous to modern tables of sine values, and used them to solve problems in trigonometry and spherical trigonometry.
 163 BC to 72 AD – Kingdom of Commagene
 150 to 75 BC – Zeno of Sidon,  Epicurean philosopher known through his pupil, Philodemus
 132 BC to 214 AD – Kingdom of Osroene
 125 to 68 BC – Antiochus of Ascalon, the pioneer of Middle Platonism
 110 to 40/35 BC – Philodemus Epicurean philosopher and poet, author of ethics, theology, rhetoric, music, poetry and history of philosophical schools
 100 to 44 BC – Julius Caesar
 92 BC to 629 AD – Roman–Persian Wars
 64 BC to 24 AD – Strabo, Greek geographer, philosopher, and historian from Pontus, Asia Minor
 63 BC – Romans annex all of Asia Minor, Syria and Judea under Pompey
 48 BC to 642 AD – Destruction of the Library of Alexandria, one of the largest and most significant libraries of the ancient world
 31 BC – Emergence of the Roman Empire as signified by the Battle of Actium
 30 BC – Romans annex Egypt
 20 BC to 50 AD – Philo of Alexandria, prominent Hellenistic Jewish philosopher 
 4 BC – Birth of Jesus of Nazareth

1st millennium AD
 27/30 AD – The ministry of Jesus of Nazareth starts
 30 to 100 AD – Apostolic Age, onset of Christianity
 37 to 100 AD – Josephus, Famous first century Roman-Jewish philosopher-historian
 50 AD – Apollodorus of Damascus, Syrian architect and engineer who introduced several Eastern innovations to the Roman Imperial style, such as making the dome a standard
 60 to 120 AD – Nicomachus, a Neopythagorean who wrote about the mystical properties of numbers, and author of Introduction to Arithmetic and Manual of Harmonics in Greek
 66 to 136 AD – Jewish–Roman wars and Jewish diaspora
 129 to 216 AD – Galen, a physician, surgeon and philosopher in the Roman Empire from Pergamon, Asia Minor
 135 AD – Roman Emperor Hadrian renamed Iudaea Province into Syria Palaestina
 150 AD – Albinus, Platonist philosopher, teacher of Galen
 160 to 210 AD – Sextus Empiricus, Pyrrhonist philosopher and physician most likely from Alexandria, author of most preserved accounts of Pyrrhonism
 175 242 AD – Ammonius Saccas, one of the founders of Neoplatonism
 184 to 253 – Origen, early Christian scholar and Church Father
 200 AD – Alexander of Aphrodisias, Peripatetic philosopher, author of Prior Analytics, Topics, Meteorology, Sense and Sensibilia, and Metaphysics
 2nd century AD to 241 AD – Kingdom of Hatra
 204/5 to 270 – Plotinus, the author of the Enneads, one of the founders of Neoplatonism
 240 AD – Diogenes Laërtius, biographer of ancient Greek philosophers, author of Lives and Opinions of Eminent Philosophers, a principal source for the history of ancient Greek philosophy.
 285 to 628 AD – Byzantine–Sasanian wars
 300 to 602 AD – Kingdom of the Lakhmids
 330 to 1453 AD – Byzantine Empire, continuation of the Roman Empire in the east, until it fell to the Ottoman Empire
 376 AD – large-scale irruption of Goths and others, and the subsequent onset of the Fall of the Western Roman Empire
 394 AD – Theodosius I suppressed the Olympic Games as part of the campaign to impose Christianity as the state religion
 412 to 485 AD – Proclus a Greek Neoplatonist philosopher who set forth one of the most elaborate and fully developed systems of Neoplatonism
 5th century to 437 AD – Syrianus, Neoplatonist philosopher, author of a commentary on the Metaphysics of Aristotle and Plato's Timaeus
 450 to 520 – Isidore of Alexandria one of the last Neoplatonist philosophers
 458 to 538 AD – Damascius, the last of Neoplatonist philosophers
 490 to 560 AD – Simplicius of Cilicia, Neoplatonist philosopher and commentator on Aristotle's de Caelo, Physica Auscultatio, and Categories, as well as a commentary upon the Enchiridion of Epictetus.
 490 to 570 AD – John Philoponus, an Alexandrian philologist, Aristotelian commentator and Christian theologian, one of the first to propose a "theory of impetus" similar to the modern concept of inertia over Aristotelian dynamics
 512 to 602 AD – Justinian dynasty of Eastern Roman Empire

Islamic Middle East

1st millennium AD

 570 – Birth of Muhammad
 573 - Birth of Abu Bakr
 585 - Birth of Umar
 573/576 - Birth of  Uthman
 601 – Birth of Ali
 614 – Persecution of the Muslims by the Quraish (Migration to Abyssinia)
 616 – Second migration to Abyssinia
 620 – Ascension to the heavens
 622 – Constitution of Medina, establishment of the first Islamic state
 624: Battle of Badr, expulsion of the Bani Qainuqa Jews from Medina
 626 – Siege of Constantinople
 629 to 1050 – Arab–Byzantine wars
 630 – Conquest of Mecca
 632 – Death of Muhammad, Designation of the successor of Muhammad
 632 to 661 – Rashidun Caliphate
 633 to 651 – Muslim conquest of Persia
 634 to 641 – Muslim conquest of the Levant (Syria)
 639 to 642 – Muslim conquest of Egypt
 642 to 799 – Khazar-Arab Wars weaken the Umayyad army and contribute to the eventual fall of the dynasty
 642 to 870 – Islamic conquest of Afghanistan
 656 to 661 – First Fitna (First Islamic Civil War)
 660 – Construction of the Great Mosque of Kufa
 661 to 750 – Umayyad Caliphate
 670 to 742 – Muslim conquest of North Africa
 674 – Siege of Constantinople (674–678) by the Umayyads against the Byzantines
 680 – The Battle of Karbala takes place, martyrdom of Husayn ibn Ali, the grandson of the Prophet Muhammad
 680 to 692 – Second Fitna (Second Islamic Civil War)
 711 to 718 – Umayyad conquest of Hispania
 711 to 714 – Muslim conquest in the Indian subcontinent 
 717 to 718 – Siege of Constantinople (717-718) 
 719 to 759 – Umayyad invasion of Gaul
 738 – Caliphate campaigns in India
 746 to 750 – Abbasid Revolution
 750 to 1258 – Abbasid Caliphate
 750 to 950 – Jabir ibn Hayyan, or anonymous authors writing under this name, pioneered organic chemistry
 766 to 869 – Habash al-Hasib al-Marwazi, the first mathematician to describe the trigonometric ratios: sine, cosine, tangent and cotangent
 770 to 840 – Khwarizmi, developed algebra
 800 to 870 – Ahmad ibn Muhammad ibn Kathir al-Farghani, One of the prominent scientists involved in the calculation of the diameter of the Earth by the measurement of the meridian arc length along others
 801 to 873 – Al-Kindi, promoter of Greek and Hellenistic philosophy, introduced Indian numerals
 810 – House of Wisdom set up in Baghdad, where Greek and Indian mathematical and astronomy works were translated into Arabic
 821 to 979 – Iranian Intermezzo
 821 to 873 – Tahirid dynasty in Iran, Afghanistan, Tajikistan, Turkmenistan, and Uzbekistan
 827 to 902 – Muslim conquest of Sicily
 836 to 901 – Thabit Ibn Qurra, discovered a theorem which enables pairs of amicable numbers to be found
 847 to 871 – Emirate of Bari
 850 to 934 – Abu Zayd al-Balkhi, pioneer of mental health, medical psychology, cognitive psychology, cognitive therapy, psychophysiology and psychosomatic medicine
 858 to 929 – Al-Battani, Syrian Arab mathematician and astronomer who introduced a number of trigonometric relations such as tan θ
 861 to 1003 – Saffarid dynasty, an Iranian Persian empire
 864 to 930 – Al-Razi, advocate of hygiene and patients' psychology, wrote on alkali, caustic soda, soap, glycerine and naphtha in "Book of the Secret of Secrets"
 872 to 950/951 – Al-Farabi (Alpharabius), pioneered social psychology and consciousness studies
 874 to 941 – Minor Occultation of the Mahdi 
 875/819 to 999 – Samanid dynasty, an Iranian empire 
 895 to 1004 – Hamdanid dynasty of Aleppo and Mosul
 899 to 976 – Qarmatian revolution
 909 – Abdullah al-Mahdi Billah, founded the Fatimid Caliphate 
 909 to 1171 – Fatimid Caliphate, originally based in Tunisia, spanned a vast area of the Arab lands, ultimately made Egypt its centre
 928 – Construction of Al-Hakim Mosque
 929 to 1031 – Caliphate of Córdoba, with the Iberian peninsula as an integral province, ruled from Damascus
 934 – Imad al-Dawla rise to power and establishment of the Buyid dynasty 
 934 to 1062 – Buyid dynasty in Iran
 936 to 1013 – Al-Zahrawi, pioneer of surgery
 941 – The Major Occultation of the Mahdi starts
 942 to 979 – Sallarid dynasty in Iran, Azerbaijan and Armenia
 945 – Sayf al-Dawla rise to power
 965 to 1091 – Emirate of Sicily
 965 to 1040 – Ibn al-Haytham, Founded experimental psychology, psychophysics, phenomenology and visual perception as well as optics and experimental physics. 
 970 – foundation of Al-Azhar University, oldest Islamic institution for higher studies
 980 to 1037 – Avicenna, pioneer of neuropsychiatry, thought experiment, self-awareness and self-consciousness
 990 to 1081 – Numayrid dynasty of Harran and Raqqa
 990 to 1096 – Uqaylid dynasty of Mosul

2nd millennium AD
 1004 – House of Knowledge built by the Fatimid caliph Al-Hakim bi-Amr Allah, said to have contained more than 1,600,000 books
 1024 to 1080 – Mirdasid dynasty of Aleppo
 1037 to 1194 – arrival of the Turkish Seljuq Empire, and the subsequent end of Arab dominance 
 1044 or 1048 to 1123 – Al-Khayyam gave a classification of cubic equations with geometric solutions using conic sections, extracted roots using the Indian decimal system
 1096 to 1487 – Crusades; four crusader states are established in the region for more than two centuries: The County of Edessa (1097–1150); the Principality of Antioch (1098–1287), the County of Tripoli (1102–1289), and the Kingdom of Jerusalem (1099–1291).
 1100 to 1166 – Muhammad al-Idrisi, known for having drawn some of the most advanced ancient world maps
 1105 to 1185 – Ibn Tufail, pioneer of tabula rasa and nature versus nurture, author of the first Philosophical novel
 1126 to 1198 – Averroes pioneer of Parkinson disease, philosophical commentator
 1136 to 1206 – Ismail al-Jazari, Muslim polymath: a scholar, inventor, mechanical engineer, artisan, artist and mathematician from Jazira, He described the crankshaft that transforms continuous rotary motion into a linear reciprocating motion, and is central to modern machinery such as the steam engine, internal combustion engine and automatic controls.
 1147 to 1269 – Almohad Caliphate, a Moroccan Berber Muslim movement, started by Ibn Tumart among the Masmuda
 1171 to 1260 – Ayyubid dynasty
 1192 to 1489 – Kingdom of Cyprus
 1201 to 1274 – Nasir al-Din al-Tusi, Persian polymath who created very accurate tables of planetary motion, an updated planetary model, and critiques of Ptolemaic astronomy. He is often considered the creator of trigonometry as a mathematical discipline in its own right, and he is believed to have influenced Copernican heliocentrism
 1204 – Sack of Constantinople by the crusaders 
 1213 to 1288 – Ibn Al-Nafis, discovered the lesser circulatory system of the heart and the lungs, and described the mechanism of breathing and its relation to the blood
 1218 to 1221 – Mongol conquest of Khwarezmia marked the beginning of the Mongol conquest of the Islamic states
 1241 to 1244 – Mongol invasions of Anatolia
 1250 to 1517 – Mamluk Sultanate of Cairo
 1258 – Forces of the Mongol Empire sack Baghdad and destroy the House of Wisdom, marking the end of the Islamic Golden Age
 1260 to 1323 – Mongol invasions of the Levant
 1260 – First major defeat the Mongols suffer at Battle of Ain Jalut, Mongol invasion of the Levant is halted
 1261 to 1517 – Abbasid Caliphate in Cairo, symbolic title
 1275 – Hasan al-Rammah, Arab chemist and engineer who studied gunpowders and explosives, and sketched prototype instruments of warfare, including the first torpedo. He also invented new types of gunpowder, and he invented a new type of fuse and two types of lighters
 1299 to 1923 – rise of the Ottoman Empire
 1300 – deportation of the last Muslims from Lucera, Italy
 1303 – Battle of Marj al-Saffar, defeat for the Mongols, which put an end to Ghazan Khan's invasions of Syria
 1332 to 1406 – Ibn Khaldun, set the basis of social sciences such as demography, cultural history, historiography, philosophy of history, sociology and economics
 1347 – a fleet of Genoese trading ships fleeing Caffa (Theodosia) reached the port of Messina and spreads the Black Death
 1380 – al-Kashi, contributed to development of decimal fractions for approximating algebraic numbers and real numbers such as pi
 1393 to 1449 – Ulugh Beg commissions an observatory at Samarqand in Uzbekistan
 1394 to 1465 – Appearance of the Arquebus, ancestor of modern firearms, in the Ottoman Empire and Europe
 1453 – Fall of Constantinople 
 1453 to 1550 – Classical Age of the Ottoman Empire
 1501 to 1736 – Safavid Iran
 1516 to 1517 – Ottoman-Mamluk War, Ottomans seize Cairo in 1517
 1526 to 1585 – Taqi ad-Din Muhammad ibn Ma'ruf, a Syrian polymath who built the Constantinople observatory, the largest observatory of the medieval world. He described a steam turbine with the practical application of rotating a spit in 1551. He also had his own method of finding coordinates of stars that was most precise at the time, and he proved the law of reflection observationally. He authored more than ninety books on a variety of different subjects
 1550 to 1700 – Transformation of the Ottoman Empire
 1700 to 1789 – Ottoman ancien régime
 1709 to 1738 – Hotak dynasty of Iran and Afghanistan
 1751 to 1794 – Zand dynasty of Iran

Contemporary Middle East

2nd millennium AD
 1789 to 1925 – Qajar Iran
 1798 – Napoleon Bonaparte leads a campaign in Egypt and Syria
 1828 to 1914 – Decline and modernization of the Ottoman Empire
 1828 – Al-Waqa'i' al-Misriyya, oldest newspaper ever established in Egypt 
 1830 to 1950 – Nahda or "Arab cultural renaissance" 
 1831 to 1833 – First Egyptian-Ottoman War, Egypt under Muhammad Ali seizes the Levantine provinces
 1834 to 1835 – Syrian Peasant Revolt takes place in the Levant, but is suppressed 
 1837 – The first newspaper in Iran, Kaghaz-i Akhbar (The Newspaper), was created for the government by Mirza Saleh Shirazi
 1838 – 1838 Druze revolt
 1839 to 1841 – Egypt loses control over the Levantine provinces after the Second Egyptian-Ottoman War
 1840 – Oriental Crisis of 1840
 1840 – Convention of London
 1851 – Darul Funun, one of the oldest modern universities in the Middle East, is established by Amir Kabir
 1860 – Al-Jinan, an Arabic-language political and literary bi-weekly magazine established in Beirut by Butrus al-Bustani, continues until 1886
 1860 – 1860 Mount Lebanon civil war
 1861 – Mount Lebanon Mutasarrifate is established
 1862 to 1892 – development of the internal combustion engine rivals the steam engine, and ultimately makes petroleum an important political factor in the following century
 1869 – Construction of the Suez Canal is completed
 1875 – Al-Ahram, second oldest and widest newspaper in circulation in Egypt is established
 1882 – British troops occupy Cairo, Egypt becomes British protectorate
 1888 – Ibrahim al-Yaziji, a Lebanese Christian writer, philologist, poet and journalist published a rich modern Arabic translation of the Bible. His works were also crucial to the establishment of the Arabic typewriter 
 1909 to 1921 – Arab nationalist organizations Al-Fatat and Al-'Ahd are established to liberate and unify Arab territories that were under Ottoman rule
 1914 to 1918 – Middle Eastern theatre of World War I
 1917 – Arthur Balfour, Foreign Minister of Great Britain, in a letter to Lord Rothschild, gives British government approval to Zionist's goal of building a "national home" in Palestine
 1918 to 1922 – Defeat and dissolution of the Ottoman Empire
 1918 – Britain and France occupy former Ottoman Empire lands
 1919 to 1921 – Franco-Syrian War
 1919 to 1923 – Asia Minor Catastrophe reshapes Anatolia, as continuous fighting incorporates the newly founded Republic of Turkey, Armenia, France, Greece
 1922 – Egypt is granted nominal independence from the United Kingdom.
 1922 to 1923 – Mandate for Syria and the Lebanon and British Mandate of Palestine and the Emirate of Transjordan come into effect.
 1924 – abolition of the Caliphate as part of Atatürk's Reforms
 1925 to 1927 – Great Syrian Revolt against the French Mandate for Syria and the Lebanon
 1925 – Sheikh Said rebellion of Kurds against Turkey
 1925 – Deposition of the Qajar dynasty of Iran
 1927 to 1930 – Ararat rebellion of Kurds, as Republic of Ararat is declared, but dissolved upon defeat
 1932 – Kingdom of Saudi Arabia declared in unification of Najd and Hejaz
 1933 to 1936 – Tribal revolts in Iraq of Assyrians in Simele, Shia in the south and Kurds in the north
 1934 – Saudi–Yemeni War
 1935 – Persia becomes Iran
 1936 to 1939 – Arab revolt in Palestine
 1937 – Dersim rebellion, is the largest uprising of the Kurds against Turkey, massive casualties
 1939 to 1945 – Mediterranean and Middle East Theatre of World War II
 1946 – Emirate of Transjordan becomes Kingdom of Jordan (named Transjordan until 1948)
 1946 – Kurdish Republic of Mahabad declared along with Azerbaijan People's Government, but defeated by Iranian military forces and dissolved
 1947 – UN General Assembly proposes to divide Palestine into an Arab and Jewish state
 1948 – Israel declares independence and Arab–Israeli war erupts
 1952 – After a revolution in Egypt the monarchy is overthrown
 1953 – The coup d'état in Iran
 1954 – Gamal Abdel Nasser becomes president of Egypt
 1954 – Central Treaty Organization
 1956 – Suez Crisis
 1961 – First Iraqi–Kurdish War erupts in north Iraq.
 1963 – Ba'ath Party comes to power in Iraq under the leadership of General Ahmad Hasan al-Bakr and Colonel Abdul Salam Arif
 1964 – Abdul Rahman Arif stages military coup in Iraq against the Ba'th Party and brings his brother, Abdul Salam Arif, to power
 1967 – Six-Day War, Israel occupies the Sinai Peninsula, Golan Heights, West Bank and Gaza Strip
 1967 – Kurds revolt in Western Iran, the revolt is crushed
 1968 – Ba'athists stage second military coup under General Ahmed Hassan al-Bakr, Saddam Hussein is made vice president of Iraq
 1970 – Gamal Abdel Nasser dies; Anwar Sadat becomes president of Egypt
 1971 – The Aswan High Dam is completed with Soviet help in finance and construction; independence of Kuwait, Qatar, Bahrain and the UAE
 1973 – Yom Kippur War
 1974 – The PLO is allowed to represent the people of Palestine in the UN
 1974 to 1975 – Second Iraqi–Kurdish War
 1975 to 1990 – Lebanese Civil War
 1976 – Syria invades Lebanon
 1978 – Camp David Accords
 1979 – Saddam Hussein becomes president of Iraq; Iranian Revolution; Egypt–Israel peace treaty
 1981 to 1989 – Iran–Iraq War results in 1–1.25 million casualties, Iraq uses chemical weapons against Iran and rebel Kurds; large scale economic devastation and surge in oil prices affect the global world economy
 1981 – Assassination of Anwar Sadat
 1982 – Israel invades Lebanon
 1987 to 1990 – First Intifada
 1991 – The Gulf War
 1993 – Oslo Accords
 1994 – 1994 civil war in Yemen

3rd millennium AD
 2000 – Israeli troops leave Lebanon
 2001 – Members of al-Qaeda attacked sites in the U.S.
 2003 – The 2003 U.S. Invasion of Iraq
 2004 to present – Shia insurgency in Yemen
 2005 – Syrian troops leave Lebanon as a result of the Cedar Revolution
 2006 – The 2006 Israel-Lebanon conflict; Saddam Hussein executed for crimes against humanity.
 2010 – Arab Spring, which culminates in the Syrian Civil War with involvement of many regional powers to either support the Syrian opposition or the ruling Ba'ath party
 2012 – The first MERS outbreak. 
 2014 – ISIS rises in Iraq and Syria; rival groups try to overthrow Syrian president
 2015 – The Saudi intervention in Yemen
 2017 – ISIS is defeated in Raqqa and Mosul, all control of territories in Syria and Iraq cease by 2019
 2020 – COVID-19 pandemic, Abraham Accords

See also 
History of the Middle East
Cities of the ancient Near East
Empires
Ancient Egypt
Sumer
Babylonia
Assyria
Hittite Empire
Persian Empire
Hellenistic Greece
Roman Empire
Ottoman Empire
Mesopotamia
history of Iraq
history of Upper Mesopotamia
Anatolia
history of Anatolia
history of Turkey
Canaan
history of the ancient Levant
history of Cyprus
history of Israel
history of Jordan
history of Lebanon
history of Palestine
history of Syria
Egypt
Ancient Egypt: 3000 BC to 332 BC
Ptolemaic Egypt: 332 BC to 30 BC
Roman Egypt: 30 BC to 639 AD
History of Arab Egypt: 639 to 1517
History of Ottoman Egypt: 1517 to 1805
Egypt under Mehemet Ali and his successors: 1805 to 1882
History of Modern Egypt: since 1882
Iran
History of Iran
Arabia
History of Saudi Arabia
History of Yemen
History of Oman
Timeline of Islamic history
Timeline of Jewish history
Timeline of the region of Palestine
History of pottery in the Southern Levant
 British foreign policy in the Middle East
 United States foreign policy in the Middle East

References

Regional timelines
History of the Middle East